Oakley station is a planned station that will be a stop on Amtrak California's San Joaquin service. It is located near Main Street between O'Hara Avenue and 2nd Street. The station was partially funded by a 2018 grant from California's Transit and Intercity Rail Capital Program. Construction is expected to be completed by 2022.

References

External links
City Of Oakley Project Site

Amtrak stations in Contra Costa County, California
Future Amtrak stations in the United States
Proposed public transportation in the San Francisco Bay Area